Polamuru is a village in Anaparthy mandal, East Godavari district, Andhra Pradesh, India.

References

Villages in Anaparthy mandal